Job ter Burg (born 13 September 1972 in Maarn) is a Dutch film editor, best known for his long-term collaborations with directors Martin Koolhoven, Paul Verhoeven and Alex van Warmerdam. 
He was invited to join the Film Editors Branch of the Academy of Motion Picture Arts and Sciences in 2015 and elected active member of American Cinema Editors in 2016.

Selected filmography
Love to Love (2003)
Godforsaken (2003)
Schnitzel Paradise (2005)
Black Book (2006)
Winter in Wartime (2008)
The Last Days of Emma Blank (2009)
Tirza (2010)
Bringing Up Bobby (2011)
Süskind (2012)
Borgman (2013)
Schneider vs. Bax (2015)
Elle (2016)
Brimstone (2016)
The Informer (2019)
Benedetta (2020)

Awards
Golden Calf Best Editing 2010 for Tirza (2010)
International Cinephile Society Award Best Editing for Elle (2016)

External links
Official site

 Job ter Burg, interview Spoiler Alert Radio

1972 births
Living people
Dutch film editors
People from Maarn
Golden Calf winners